Michael Wilks (born 14 December 1973) is a former Australian international lawn bowler.

Bowls career
Wilks made his Australian debut in 2003 and won the silver medal in the fours at the 2004 World Outdoor Bowls Championship.

He won two medals at the 2003 Asia Pacific Bowls Championships in Brisbane.

He announced his international retirement in 2005 after only two years as an international.

References

Living people
1973 births
Australian male bowls players
21st-century Australian people